Jarabina, also known as Orjabyna is a village and municipality in Stará Ľubovňa District in the Prešov Region of northern Slovakia.

U.S. Marine Michael Strank, Flag Raiser at Iwo Jima, was born here.

History
In historical records the village was first mentioned in 1329.

Geography
The municipality lies at an altitude of 587 metres and covers an area of 22.896 km2. It has a population of about 844 people.

Genealogical resources

The records for genealogical research are available at the state archive "Statny Archiv in Levoca, Slovakia"

 Roman Catholic church records (births/marriages/deaths): 1852-1927 (parish B)
 Greek Catholic church records (births/marriages/deaths): 1789-1929 (parish A)

See also
 List of municipalities and towns in Slovakia

External links
Jarabina - The Carpathian Connection
 https://web.archive.org/web/20071027094149/http://www.statistics.sk/mosmis/eng/run.html
Surnames of living people in Jarabina

Villages and municipalities in Stará Ľubovňa District